Mount Vernon High School is a public four-year high school located in Mount Vernon, Ohio, United States.  It is the only high school in the Mount Vernon City Schools district.  The school's mascot is the Yellow Jacket, and its official colors are orange and black. The mascot is actually orange and black rather than yellow and black, due to copyright reasons. It is located at 300 Martinsburg Road, near State Route 586. Near the high school is Mount Vernon Middle School, the only one in the district.  Also nearby is Mount Vernon Nazarene University, MVNU.

Mount Vernon is currently a member of the Ohio Cardinal Conference.

Clubs and activities
The school's Latin Club functions as a local chapter of both the Ohio Junior Classical League and National Junior Classical League.

Notable alumni
 David Hahn, politician, class of 1973
 Paul Lynde, actor, class of 1944

External links
 District website

References

High schools in Knox County, Ohio
Public high schools in Ohio